Senne may refer to:

Places
Senne (Germany), a natural region of Germany
Senne, a district of Bielefeld, Germany
Senne (river), a river of Belgium
Senné (disambiguation), places in Slovakia

People with the name 
Yōkō Senne, a 13th-century Japanese monk
Aaron Senne (born 1987), American baseball player from Florida
Mike Senne (born 1964), American baseball player from Arizona
René Le Senne (1882–1954), French philosopher and psychologist
Senne Lammens (born 2002), Belgian footballer who plays as a goalkeeper for NXT
Senne Leysen (born 1996), Belgian cyclist
Senne Lynen (born 1999), Belgian footballer who plays as a midfielder for Union SG
Senne Rouffaer (1925–2006), Belgian actor and film director